The American College of Sports Medicine (ACSM), headquartered in Indianapolis, Indiana, is a sports medicine and exercise science membership organization. Founded in 1954, ACSM holds conferences, publishes books and journals, and offers certification programs for personal trainers and exercise physiologists.

History
The American College of Sports Medicine was founded in 1954 as the "Federation of Sports Medicine" in New York City at the Hotel Statler on April 22, as part of the afternoon program of the American Association for Health, Physical Education, and Recreation (AAHPER). The following year, the American College of Sports Medicine (ACSM) was officially incorporated, and 11 individuals were designated as founders. This group was composed of seven men and one woman with careers in physical education, as well as three physicians. The physical educators were Clifford Brownell, Ph.D. Ernst Jok, M.D., Peter Karpovich, M.D., Leonard Larson, Ph.D. Grover Mueller, M.S., Neils Neilson, Ph.D, Josephine Rathbone, Ph.D. and Arthur Steinhaus, Ph.D. Although they had training in physical education or were employed in departments of physical education, Jokl, Larson, Karpovich, and Steinhaus were primarily involved in research dealing with the physiology of exercise. The physicians were Louis Bishop, M.D., Albert Hyman, M.D., and Joseph Wolffe, M.D. All three were practicing cardiologists.

The ACSM national headquarters moved to Indianapolis in 1984, joining organizations such as the National Collegiate Athletic Association, the National Federation of State High School Associations, and national sport-specific governing bodies.

Leadership
The current ACSM elected offices are held by:

 President: Anastasia Fischer, M.D., FACSM 
 President-Elect: Irene Davis, PhD., P.T. FACSM, FATPA, FASB
 Immediate Past-President: L. Bruce Gladden, Ph.D., FACSM
 First Vice Presidents: William Farquhar, Ph.D., FACSM and Wendy Kohrt, Ph.D., FACSM
 Second Vice Presidents: Laura Rogers, M.D., M.P.H., FACSM, FACP and Nailah Coleman, M.D., FACSM, FAAP
 Treasurer: Mindy Millard-Stafford, Ph.D., FACSM

Membership
ACSM membership is offered in four categories:
 Alliance of Health Fitness Professionals
 Professional
 Professional-in-Training
 Students

Regional chapters

ACSM has 12 regional chapters throughout the United States: 
 
 Alaska ACSM Regional Chapter
 Central States ACSM Regional Chapter
 Greater New York ACSM Regional Chapter
 Mid-Atlantic ACSM Regional Chapter
 Midwest ACSM Regional Chapter
 New England ACSM Regional Chapter
 Northland ACSM Regional Chapter
 Northwest ACSM Regional Chapter
 Rocky Mountain ACSM Regional Chapter
 Southeast ACSM Regional Chapter
 Southwest ACSM Regional Chapter
 Texas ACSM Regional Chapter

Journals, books and publications

The American College of Sports Medicine publishing program includes six journals, several books and various multimedia resources.

Journals
ACSM's six leading scholarly journals include research, clinical reports and health-and-fitness information.
 Medicine & Science in Sports & Exercise
 Exercise and Sport Sciences Reviews
Current Sports Medicine Reports
ACSM's Health & Fitness Journal
Translational Journal of the American College of Sports Medicine
Exercise, Sport, and Movement

Books
ACSM publishes several books and multimedia resources.

ACSM is best known for ACSM's Guidelines for Exercise Testing and Prescription, first published in 1975.

Some of ACSM's most popular titles include:
ACSM's Clinical Exercise Physiology
ACSM's Complete Guide to Fitness and Health
ACSM's Health/Fitness Facility Standards and Guidelines
ACSM's Introduction to Exercise Science
ACSM's Nutrition for Exercise Science
ACSM's Resources for the Exercise Physiologist
ACSM's Resources for the Personal Trainer
ACSM's Foundations of Strength Training and Conditioning

Certifications
ACSM offers four different certifications for fitness and clinical exercise professionals, and a number of credential and specialty certificate programs.

ACSM Certified Personal Trainer
ACSM Certified Group Exercise Instructor
ACSM Certified Exercise Physiologist
ACSM Certified Clinical Exercise Physiologist
Exercise is Medicine Credential
Autism Exercise Specialist

Foundation
The American College of Sports Medicine Foundation is a 501(c)(3) nonprofit organization affiliated with and developed to support the American College of Sports Medicine, Inc. Each year the ACSM Foundation awards more than $100,000 in research awards and scholarships.

See also
Board of Certification, Inc.
Personal Trainer
Sports Medicine
Exercise is Medicine
ACSM American Fitness Index

References

Further reading 

Berryman, J.W. (1995). Out of many, one: A history of the American College of Sports Medicine. Human Kinetics. 

Boerigter, R.J. (1978). A History of the American College of Sports Medicine. University of Utah.

External links
 Official website
 ACSM Profile - IDEAfit.com

Sports organizations established in 1954
Medical associations based in the United States
Medical and health organizations based in Indiana
Non-profit organizations based in Indianapolis